The 1980 Benson & Hedges Championships, also known as the Wembley Championships, was a men's tennis tournament played on indoor carpet courts at the Wembley Arena in London, England that was part of the 1980 Volvo Grand Prix. The tournament was held from 11 November through 16 November 1980. First-seeded John McEnroe won the singles title and the accompanying $30,000 first-prize money. It was his third successive singles title at the tournament.

Finals

Singles
 John McEnroe defeated  Gene Mayer 6–4, 6–3, 6–3
 It was McEnroe's 8th singles title of the year and the 23rd of his career.

Doubles
 John McEnroe /  Peter Fleming defeated  Bill Scanlon /  Eliot Teltscher 7–5, 6–3

References

External links
 ITF tournament edition details

Benson and Hedges Championships
Wembley Championships
Benson and Hedges Championships
Benson and Hedges Championships
Benson and Hedges Championships
Tennis in London